Alice Rollit Coe (1858–1940) was a Canadian emigrant to the United States, Seattle housewife and author. She wrote Lyrics of Fir and Foam (1908) and Chimes Rung by the University District Herald (1921).

Biography
She was born Alice Sarah Rollit in Rawdon, Quebec, Canada on September 20, 1858, to John Charles Rollit and Elizabeth (née Spooner) Rollit. Her father was an Episcopal Minister, who moved his family to the United States and was living in Minneapolis with them in 1880. She had at least two sisters growing up.

She married Alfred Byron Coe on November 14, 1889, in Minneapolis, Minnesota, and had four children with him: Charles Rollit Coe (born 1890), Winnifred Elizabeth Coe (born 1892), Algernon Sydney Coe (born 1894), and Constance Mary Coe (born 1901).  In the 1920 census in Seattle she was listed as being a teacher. In the 1930 census in Seattle she was a private tutor.

She died in Seattle, Washington, on December 8, 1940.

Works

Books
Lyrics of Fir and Foam, Etchings by L. Ross Carpenter, The Alice Harriman Company, Publishers, Seattle, 1908
Chimes Rung by the University District Herald, Press of University Publishing Company, Seattle, 1921

Poems in magazines and anthologies
Life's Rose, Out West Magazine.
The Turn of the Road from The Home Book of Verse, Volume 2.

See also
Canadian poetry

References

External links
 Ancestry.com page, 1900 United States Federal Census; location, Seattle, Ward 9, District 119, King County, Washington; roll T623  1745; page 8B; lines 68-72; enumdist 119 
Ancestry.com page, 1910 United States Federal Census; location, Seattle, Ward 10,  King County,  Washington; roll T624_1661; page 10B; lines 81-86; enumdist 0181; Image 756; Family History Library number 1375674 
Ancestry.com page, 1920 United States Federal Census; location, Seattle, Precinct 8,  King County,  Washington; roll T625_1925; page 11a; lines 35-37; enumdist 72; Image 750 
Ancestry.com page, 1930 United States Federal Census; location, Seattle, Block 151,  King County,  Washington; roll 2492; page 20a; lines 38 & 39; Image 910.0; Family History Library Film 2342226. 

20th-century American poets
20th-century Canadian poets
Canadian women poets
Canadian emigrants to the United States
Housewives
People from Lanaudière
Canadian people of English descent
Writers from Seattle
1858 births
1940 deaths
American women poets
20th-century Canadian women writers
20th-century American women writers